Henry Wharton Conway (March 18, 1793 – November 9, 1827) was a United States naval officer during the War of 1812 and a politician in Arkansas Territory, who was elected as a territorial delegate (1823–1827) to the United States House of Representatives for three consecutive congresses. He died in 1827 as a result of wounds from a duel with Robert Crittenden, a former friend and political ally.

Biography
Conway was born into a planter family on March 18, 1793, as the son of Thomas and Ann ( Rector) Conway, in Greene County, Tennessee. He was educated by private tutors. He had two younger brothers who followed him into politics in the West.

Career
During the War of 1812, Conway was commissioned as an Ensign in the United States Navy, and was promoted to Lieutenant in 1813. In 1817, Conway became a clerk in the U.S. Treasury. Having saved money for his journey, the following year he joined the migration West to the Missouri Territory. In 1820, he moved to the Arkansas Territory. There he became active in territorial politics, forming a friendship and an alliance with Robert Crittenden. His younger brothers James S. and Elias N. Conway also later became politicians in Arkansas after it became a state in 1836; they served as first and fifth governors of the state, respectively. In Arkansas Territory, he was appointed as receiver of public moneys, serving from 1820 through 1821.

Conway was elected in 1822 as a territorial delegate to the Eighteenth Congress and was re-elected to the Nineteenth, and Twentieth Congresses, serving in total from March 4, 1823 until his death. Following political differences in 1825, Conway and Crittenden grew apart, publicizing their feud in newspapers. Their conflict resulted in a duel held on October 29, 1827, near Napoleon. Conway was mortally wounded by Crittenden and died several days later on November 9, 1827.

Death and legacy
Conway died on November 9, 1827, and is interred at Scull Cemetery, Arkansas Post, Arkansas. Conway County, Arkansas, is named after him.

See also
 Conway-Johnson family
 List of United States Congress members who died in office (1790–1899)
 List of United States Congress members killed or wounded in office

References

External links
 

 Henry Wharton Conway, Encyclopedia of Arkansas History & Culture entry
 Conway-Crittenden Duel, Encyclopedia of Arkansas History & Culture entry

1793 births
1827 deaths
19th-century American politicians
American politicians killed in duels
Arkansas postmasters
Arkansas Democratic-Republicans
Conway-Johnson family
Deaths by firearm in Arkansas
Delegates to the United States House of Representatives from Arkansas Territory
Methodists from Arkansas
People from Greeneville, Tennessee
United States Navy officers
United States Navy personnel of the War of 1812